Jessie Evans may refer to:

 Jessie Evans (basketball), college basketball coach
 Jessie Evans (singer), American-born songwriter, singer, saxophonist and record producer in Germany
 Jesse Evans (1853–?), outlaw and gunman of the Old West
 Jesse Evans Gang